Gagea stepposa is a Chinese flowering plant in the lily family. It is found only in the northern part of Xinjiang Province in northwestern China.

Gagea stepposa is a bulb-forming herb up to 6 cm tall. Flowers are yellow-orange from the front, dark purple from the back.

References

External links
Flora of China Illustrations vol. 24, figures 104, drawings 1-2 at lower left line drawings of Gagea stepposa

stepposa
Flora of Xinjiang
Plants described in 1980